Amiram Tamari (22 March 1913 – 3 July 1981) was an Israeli illustrator and artist. Tamari was a Dizengoff Prize winner for painting in 1941.

Biography 
Amiram Tamari was born in the spring of 1913 in Hadera, the son of Tzipora and Michael Tamari-Teitelman, Hapoel Hatzair. Growing up in Tel Aviv, he studied at the Académie de la Grande Chaumière and the Académie Julian in Paris. 

Tamari's oil paintings focused on landscapes of Eretz Yisrael in an abstract style. Tamari won the Dizengoff Prize for Painting in 1941. in addition, Tamari illustrated children's books published by Gadish Publishers, including the book "Hasamba Street Fighting in Gaza", which was published in 1957.

He taught painting at the Levinsky College of Education and at the Dugma School in Tel Aviv.

He was married to Chana née Schleselberg and had a daughter, Maya, born in 1947.

Awards and recognition
 1941-1942 Dizengoff Prize for Painting and Sculpture
 1943 Dizengoff Prize for Painting and Sculpture, Municipality of Tel Aviv-Yafo
 1944-1945 First Prize for Painting, Egypt

External links

References 

1913 births
1981 deaths
20th-century Israeli male artists
Israeli illustrators
Israeli painters